The surname Kulesh may refer to:

Uladzislau Kulesh (born 1996), Belarusian handball player
Daria Kulesh,  lead vocalist  of Kara (British band)

See also
Kulish